Tanzim ("Organization") is a militant faction of the Palestinian Fatah movement.

Overview
The Tanzim militia, founded in 1995 by Yasser Arafat and other Fatah leaders to counter Palestinian Islamism, is widely considered to be an armed offshoot of Fatah with its own leadership structure. The acknowledged head of the Tanzim is Marwan Barghouti, who is as of 2017, serving five consecutive life sentences in Israel for murder, and, according to some accounts, has a substantial following among the rejectionist camp which opposes the Interim Agreement (also called Oslo II or Taba) signed on 28 September 1995 with Israel.

The Tanzim is a grass roots organization that operates at the community level. By taking a hardline position against Israel, it has helped siphon Palestinian support from the Islamist groups to the Palestinian Authority and PLO leadership.

Tanzim came to prominence in the street fighting which marked the beginning of the second Palestinian Intifada. Its members tend to be younger than those of other Fatah factions, often having grown up in the post-Oslo era. Many Tanzim members have joined the al-Shaid Yasser Arafat Brigades (formerly the al Aqsa Martyrs' Brigades). Tanzim has also recruited female suicide bombers, including Andaleeb Takatka, a 20-year-old Bethlehem woman who detonated an explosive belt at a Jerusalem bus stop in April 2002, killing six Israeli civilians, and injuring sixty.  Marwan Barghouti, widely described as heading Tanzim, explicitly condemned terror attacks within Israel, writing "While I, and the Fatah movement to which I belong, strongly oppose attacks and the targeting of civilians inside Israel, our future neighbor, I reserve the right to protect myself, to resist the Israeli occupation of my country and to fight for my freedom."

On 15 February 2015, the Israeli army arrested Jamal Abu Lel, charging that he was "the head of" the Tanzim "terrorist organization," running it from the Qalandiya refugee camp while carrying an Israeli permanent resident identity card due to his residing in Kfar Aqab, on the other side of the Jerusalem Airport from Qalandiya. Abu Lel is accused by the Shin Bet of funding and directing terrorist and shooting attacks against Israelis.

Attacks against military and civilian targets 

Fatah Tanzim have conducted a number of attacks against Israeli civilians and military, including against women and children. Below is a partial list of terrorist attacks:

See also
Palestinian political violence

References

External links
Fatah Tanzim at GlobalSecurity.org

Fatah
Palestinian militant groups
Military wings of socialist parties
Defunct Palestinian militant groups
1995 establishments in the Palestinian territories